Anthurium jenmanii is a species of plant in the genus Anthurium. Growing as an epiphyte subshrub, it is native to South America from Trinidad and Tobago to Brazil. A member of the section Pachyneurium, and like related species it has a "birds nest" growth habit. It has a dark purple-black spadix and spathe, and produces red berries. In cultivation, it is commonly mistaken for Anthurium bonplandii subsp. guayanum, a related species.

References

jenmanii
Plants described in 1905